HomeServe is a British multinational home emergency repairs and improvements business based in Walsall, England. Established in 1993, it was listed on the London Stock Exchange until it was acquired by Brookfield Asset Management in January 2023. HomeServe operates in the United Kingdom, United States, Canada, France, Spain and Japan.

History
The company was originally established by Richard Harpin in 1993 as a joint venture between South Staffordshire Water and himself under the name of Fastfix to offer an emergency plumbing service. In 1994, the company diversified offering plumbing and drainage policies under the name "HomeServiceScheme". It launched Doméo, a joint venture in France in 2001, and Home Service in the United States in 2003. Attempts to launch in Australia failed, after objections were raised in the Australian Parliament.  The water business was demerged from the rest of the Group in 2004 and the name of the company was changed to HomeServe PLC.

The Company bought property repair company Reparalia in Spain in 2007, the French warranty provider SFG in 2009 and National Grid's service contract business in the United States in 2010.

In 2010, HomeServe launched Assitenza Casa in Italy, however in March 2017 they sold 51% of this business to Edison, and the remaining 49% in July 2019.

In 2012, HomeServe launched in Germany, but the venture was unsuccessful and was sold in 2015.

In a list of the "best places to work in the UK" published by Glassdoor in 2016, HomeServe was placed third, being an entry in the list for the first time.

HomeServe's North American business has made a series of acquisitions, including Utility Service Partners in 2016, Dominion Products and Services in 2017, and in 2019 ServLine and a 79% stake in eLocal. 2019 saw the profit from the US business overtake that of the UK.

In 2017, HomeServe announced the acquisition of 40% of Checkatrade, an online directory of customer recommended tradespeople and took complete ownership later that year. Simultaneously, the Company took a 70% stake in Habitissimo, a Spanish web platform that connects homeowners to tradespeople and purchased the remaining 30% in 2019.

In 2018, UK recruitment website Indeed, named Homeserve as the UK's fourth best private sector employer based on millions of employee ratings and reviews.

In 2019, HomeServe expanded into Japan with a joint venture with the Mitsubishi Corporation.

During the 2020 COVID-19 pandemic lockdown, HomeServe offered free emergency repairs to NHS and social care workers in the UK and introduced a telephone-based repair advice service in the US.

In March 2022, it was reported that Brookfield Asset Management was considering a buyout of HomeServe. The company agreed to recommend an offer from Brookfield Asset Management worth £4.08 billion in July 2022. In December 2022, the company announced that all conditions for the takeover had been met, so allowing the transaction to proceed.

Sports sponsorship
In 2010, HomeServe signed a one-year, £750,000 deal to be the official sponsor of then Premier League club West Bromwich Albion F.C. for the 2010/11 season. The club had previously sponsored a stand at West Bromwich Albion's neighbouring clubs, Walsall F.C.  In 2014, HomeServe signed a three-year deal to sponsor the Main Stand at Walsall F.C.'s Bescot Stadium. Later in 2014, it was announced that HomeServe would be the official kit sponsor of Walsall F.C. in a three-year deal. In 2017, HomeServe signed a five-year deal with Walsall F.C.

Criticism 
During the period 2008 to 2011 the UK business breached the Financial Conduct Authority's Principles of Business, in particular mis-selling of policies to customers. As a result, HomeServe suspended all UK sales activity between October 2011 and January 2012 for retraining sales staff and was fined £30,647,400 by the FCA in 2014. Throughout this period, three private equity groups looked to acquire the company but were rejected by HomeServe's board.

In April 2012, Ofcom imposed a fine of £750,000 for making silent and abandoned calls to prospective customers in the period February to March 2011. It has since ceased the practice of cold-calling customers.

References

External links
 Corporate site
 

Companies based in the West Midlands (county)
Business services companies established in 1993
Companies listed on the London Stock Exchange